Sun Tsui-feng (born 19 December 1958) is a Taiwanese opera performer and one of the most renowned stage actresses in Taiwan. Despite entering this profession at 26 years old — much later than other traditional opera artists — and growing up in a Mandarin-speaking rather than a Taiwanese Hokkien-speaking household, Sun overcame layers of difficulty and emerged as a leading sheng (male) role impersonator for the Ming Hwa Yuan opera troupe in the 1980s. She has also starred in a large number of non-musical films and TV series, including the 2006 TV series The Grandmaster's Daughter (祖師爺的女兒) which is based on her 2000 autobiography.

Filmography

Film

Television series

References

1958 births
Living people
Taiwanese film actresses
Taiwanese television actresses
Taiwanese opera actresses
20th-century Taiwanese actresses
21st-century Taiwanese actresses
20th-century Taiwanese women singers
21st-century Taiwanese women singers
People from Chiayi County
Male impersonators in Taiwanese opera